Edward Hayden may refer to:

 Edward D. Hayden (1833–1908), U.S. Representative from Massachusetts
 Edward Everett Hayden (1858–1932), American naval officer, inventor and meteorologist